The members of the 27th General Assembly of Newfoundland were elected in the Newfoundland general election held in June 1928. The general assembly sat from 1928 to 1932.

The Liberal Party led by Richard Squires formed the government in partnership with members of the Fishermen's Protective Union.

Albert J. Walsh served as speaker.

Sir John Middleton served as governor of Newfoundland.

Members of the Assembly 
The following members were elected to the assembly in 1928:

Notes:

By-elections 
By-elections were held to replace members for various reasons:

Notes:

References 

Terms of the General Assembly of Newfoundland and Labrador